Garry Noel Price (born December 9, 1935) is a Canadian former professional ice hockey defenceman. He played in the National Hockey League with seven teams between 1957 to 1976. He also spent considerable time in the minor American Hockey League during his career, which lasted from 1956 to 1976.

Price started his National Hockey League career with the Toronto Maple Leafs in 1958. He would also play for the New York Rangers, Detroit Red Wings, Montreal Canadiens, Los Angeles Kings, Pittsburgh Penguins and Atlanta Flames. He would retire after the 1976 season. He would win one Stanley Cup with Montreal in 1966. He was the last remaining active member of the Pittsburgh Penguins' 1967–68 expansion team.

Career statistics

Regular season and playoffs

Awards and achievements 
 WHL Prairie Division Second All-Star Team (1957)
 AHL Second All-Star Team (1966)
 AHL First All-Star Team (1970, 1972, and 1976)
 Eddie Shore Award (AHL) Outstanding Defenceman (1970, 1972, and 1976)
 Played in NHL All-Star Game (1967)
 American Hockey League [AHL] Calder Cup Champions with Springfield Indians (1960 & 1961) and Halifax Voyageurs (1972 and 1976)
 Inducted into the American Hockey League Hall Of Fame (2008)

External links

1935 births
Living people
Atlanta Flames players
Baltimore Clippers players
Canadian ice hockey defencemen
Detroit Red Wings players
Ice hockey people from Ontario
Los Angeles Kings players
Montreal Canadiens players
New York Rangers players
Nova Scotia Voyageurs players
Pittsburgh Penguins players
Quebec Aces (AHL) players
Rochester Americans players
Sportspeople from Brockville
Springfield Indians players
Springfield Kings players
Stanley Cup champions
Toronto Maple Leafs players
Toronto St. Michael's Majors players
Winnipeg Warriors (minor pro) players